Point University is a private evangelical Christian university in West Point, Georgia. It was founded in 1937 as Atlanta Christian College in East Point. The college announced its name change to Point University in 2011 and relocated its main campus to West Point in June 2012.

History

Atlanta Christian College 
Atlanta Christian College was founded in 1937 by Thomas Olin Hathcock (1879–1966), a prominent Fulton County, Georgia judge from 1914 until 1942. He and his wife, Nora Head Hathcock, were members of the Christian churches and churches of Christ, the denomination that the institution has always been affiliated with. The property for the campus was from a 300-acre farm Nora Hathcock had inherited.

Following its 1937 founding, Atlanta Christian College devoted itself mainly to the education of ministers, missionaries, and other church-related workers. In 1965, the college became an accredited member of the American Association of Bible Colleges (AABC). In 1990, in conjunction with a broadening of its curriculum, the college was accredited by the Commission on Colleges of the Southern Association of Colleges and Schools (SACS) to award associate and baccalaureate degrees.

Point University 
In 2011, the institution's name was changed to Point University. The following year, the college relocated its main campus to West Point, Georgia, an hour southwest of the previous main campus near Atlanta. Adult learning classes were continued to be held at the East Point location, as well as an adult learning program and dual-credit enrollment program for high school students at the off-site locations in Peachtree City, Savannah, and Birmingham, Alabama.

In addition to renovating the former West Point-Stevens headquarters for use as the primary academic building for traditional program studies in West Point, the university also has apartment-style student housing in nearby Valley, Alabama.

In addition to moving its main campus in 2012, the university was also accepted into the National Association of Intercollegiate Athletics (NAIA). The university's athletics program expanded as part of the transition from the National Christian College Athletic Association (NCCAA) to the NAIA, including the addition of intercollegiate football, softball and cross country beginning in fall 2011. The athletics nickname was also changed from the Chargers to the Skyhawks. In Spring 2014, the Point University Skyhawks were admitted to the recently started Sun conference as a charter member.

Presidents
George W. BonDurant (1937–1947)
Orvel C. Crowder (1947–1955)
James C. Redmon (1955–1978)
Paul K. Carrier (1978–1984)
James C. Donovan (1984–1993)
R. Edwin Groover (1993–2006)
Dean C. Collins (2006–present)

Academics
Point University is accredited by the Commission on Colleges of the Southern Association of Colleges and Schools (SACS) to award associate and baccalaureate degrees. Its accreditation was most recently affirmed in 2016. The teacher education programs are accredited by the Professional Standards Commission (PSC) of the State of Georgia.

Athletics

The Point athletic teams are called the Skyhawks. The university is a member of the National Association of Intercollegiate Athletics (NAIA), primarily competing in the Appalachian Athletic Conference (AAC) for most of its sports since the 2011–12 academic year. Its football team was a member of The Sun Conference for the 2014 and 2015 fall seasons, before moving to the Appalachian Division of the Mid-South Conference (MSC) where they competed from the 2017 to 2021 fall seasons (2017–18 to 2021–22 school years). They were also a member of the National Christian College Athletic Association (NCCAA), primarily competing as an independent in the South Region of the Division II level.

Point competes in 21 intercollegiate varsity sports: Men's sports include baseball, basketball, cross country, distance track, football, golf, lacrosse, soccer, swimming, tennis; while women's sports include basketball, cross country, distance track, golf, lacrosse, soccer, softball, swimming, tennis and volleyball; and co-ed sports include cheerleading.

On August 9, 2022, Point was invited and unanimously approved to join the Southern States Athletic Conference (SSAC), effective July 1, 2023.

Accomplishments
The Skyhawks (previously known as the Atlanta Christian Chargers) have won a number of regional and national championships, most recently the 2010 NCCAA Division II national championship in baseball.

Notable students and alumni
Jamie Grace (Class of 2012) – Christian singer-songwriter signed to TobyMac-founded label, Gotee Records.

References

External links
 
 Official athletics website

 
Universities and colleges affiliated with the Christian churches and churches of Christ
Universities and colleges accredited by the Southern Association of Colleges and Schools
Educational institutions established in 1937
Education in Fulton County, Georgia
Buildings and structures in Fulton County, Georgia
East Point, Georgia
1937 establishments in Georgia (U.S. state)
Appalachian Athletic Conference schools
Private universities and colleges in Georgia (U.S. state)